Harold Edward Snoad (born 28 August 1935) is a British television producer, writer and director. He is best known for the television sitcom Keeping Up Appearances, starring Patricia Routledge and Clive Swift. He is also well known for having directed and produced Ever Decreasing Circles starring Richard Briers and Peter Egan, as well as Don't Wait Up starring Tony Britton and Nigel Havers.

He has also had a successful writing career with his writing partner Michael Knowles, writing the radio spinoff of Dad's Army, It Sticks Out Half a Mile which evolved into the short-lived television series for ITV called High & Dry.

Directing and Producing Career 
Harold Snoad joined the BBC in 1957, after working in the theatre, and had numerous roles, including as a ‘call boy’ for an episode of Hancock's Half Hour in 1960. Snoad soon gained promotion, becoming a producer and director in 1969. At the time, he was one of the youngest directors work in television. His first directing role came with Dad's Army starring Arthur Lowe, John Le Mesurier and Clive Dunn. Snoad had already served as Production Assistant in series one and two and was responsible for choosing the town of Thetford in Norfolk as the site for the location filming. The first episode which was directed by Snoad was The Lion Has Phones which was first broadcast on 25 September 1969 and attracted 11.3 million viewers. in 1973, Snoad directed the sitcom Casanova '73 starring Leslie Phillips, but the series was not a success and received criticism from the likes of Mary Whitehouse. Snoad later went on to say of the series that he felt that if it had been aired five years later then it would probably have been better received. In 1974, he went on to work on series two of  Are You Being Served?. Later that year, Snoad began to work on The Dick Emery Show, the show was already in its twelfth series by then and he would continue to direct and produce the show until its end in 1981. In 1976, Snoad directed with Ray Cooney his first feature film Not Now, Comrade which starred Leslie Phillips, Windsor Davies, Don Estelle and Ian Lavender.

In the 1980s, Snoad worked on all six series of Don't Wait Up, starring Tony Britton, Nigel Havers and Dinah Sheridan which ran from 1983 to 1990. In 2009, Snoad recalled a joke that the cast played on him while he was having dinner with Patricia Routledge, he said: "Tony Britton - who, by his own admission, did not always arrive at rehearsals dead on time - stopped and knelt down in front of me and asked whether I would be kind enough to allow him another forty-eight hours to complete the five hundred lines I had given him for being late the previous morning! Tony moved on and was replaced by Nigel Havers and Dinah Sheridan who begged forgiveness for chatting during rehearsals. Simon Williams apologised for mucking up one of his lines that morning. One by one the whole cast generally ‘bowed and scraped’. As the last member moved on Patricia turned to me and said, ‘They obviously adore you!'"’  Snoad then went on to direct and produce the final two series of Ever Decreasing Circles after the show previous director, Sydney Lotterby was replaced due to not giving enough direction to the leading actors. The series starred Richard Briers, Penelope Wilton and Peter Egan. The series  attracted 12 million views, It is series four of Ever Decreasing Circles which Snoad uses as a case study for his 1988 book Directing Situation Comedy. While working on the show, Peter Egan observed that Snoad had a very different technique to Lotterby saying that while Lotterby was an introvert, Snoad was an extrovert. In 1988, Snoad directed and produced the television film Wife begins at 40, for this Snoad again worked with Ray Cooney, who he had worked with in Not Now, Comrade. In 1990 he began work on the series that he is perhaps best known, Keeping Up Appearances. The programme ran for five series with 44 episodes, it was ranked 12th in the 2004 poll in Britain's Best Sitcom. By February 2016, the show had been sold almost 1,000 times to overseas broadcaster making it the BBC's most exported television program.

After 38 years of working with the BBC, Snoad returned to the Theatre and in 2009 directed the stage play Say Who You Are. Later that year, he published his second book It's Bouquet - Not Bucket! In which he tells the behind the scenes story of the series. In the book he states that "My intention in writing this book is ... to provide the millions of fans of Keeping Up Appearance with a 'companion' to the series". On the fiftieth anniversary of the first airing of Dad's Army, Snoad gave an interview for the BBC, in which they said "The director of many of the earliest episodes of Dad's Army, which is 50 years old, has said he doubts many of today's shows will last as long." He went on to say that "Nowadays comedies are not so much family-viewing." He has given a number of talks on cruise liners, mainly on the Queen Elizabeth 2 on the subject of television comedy.

In 2016 Snoad returned to directing television for the Animated short, Dads Army: A Stripe for Frazer which was a recreation of the original episode A Stripe for Frazer from 1969, of which all recording have since been wiped. Only the audio tape and the radio episode have serviced from the original episode.

Writing career 
Snoad began writing with Michael Knowles in 1972 after they were introduced by their mutual friend, Jimmy Perry. When it was decided that there would be a Dad’s Army radio series, Perry and Croft were too busy writing series six so it was suggested that Harold Snoad should adapt it with Michael Knowles. In total 67 episodes of Dad's Army were adapted for radio. In 2017, nine of there radio scripts were adapted for the stage into a performance called The Dads Army Radio hour (later The Dads Army Radio Show) by David Benson  and Jack Lane for the Edinburgh Festival Fringe. They toured the country with the show until March 2020 when it was cut short by the COVID-19 pandemic. In 1981, Snoad and Knowles created the Dad's Army spinoff radio series It Sticks Out Half a Mile. In 1985 ,they again worked together to create the television adaptation of It Sticks Out Half a Mile with the pilot "Walking The Plank", starring Bernard Cribbins, Richard Wilson and Angus Barnett. The BBC did not order a series, but in 1987 Yorkshire Television ordered seven episodes under the name of High & Dry. Despite the series’ success it was short-lived, many criticised it for its lack of location filming which was due to a technicality with union rules. For the series, Snoad uses the pseudonym Alan Sherwood due to his contract to the BBC at the time.

Awards  
Throughout Snoad's career, he has reserved a number of awards. In 1987 and in 1988 he was nominated for a BAFTA for his work on Ever Decreasing Circles. Then in 1989, for Don't Wait Up he reserved the Television and Radio Industries Club award for 'Sitcom of the Year'. For his work on Keeping Up Appearances, he reserved two further BAFTA nominations and the prestigious Dutch award, the Silver Tulip.

Credits: Directing/Producing 

 1969–1970: Dad's Army - 7 episodes
 1969: Oh, Brother! - 3 episodes
 1972: Idle At Work - 1 episode
 1972: His Lordship Entertains - all 7 episodes
 1972: Them - 5 episodes
 1973: 7 of 1 - 3 episodes
 1973: Elementary, My Dear Watson - 1 episode
 1973: Home from Home - 1 episode
 1973: Spanner's Eleven - 1 episode
 1973: Another Fine Mess - 1 episode
 1973: One Man's Meat - 1 episode
 1973: Casanova '73 - all 7 episodes
 1974: Are You Being Served? - 5 episodes
 1974: French Relish - 1 episode
 1974–1981: The Dick Emery Show - 52 episodes
 1975: The Rough with the Smooth - all 6 episodes
 1976: Not Now, Comrade
 1977: No Appointment Necessary - 2 episodes
 1978–1980: Rings on Their Fingers - all 20 episodes
 1981: Partners - 6 episodes
 1982: Emery Presents: Legacy of Murder - all 6 episodes
 1982: The Further Adventures of Lucky Jim - all 7 episodes
 1983: Tears Before Bedtime - 1 episode
 1983–1990: Don't Wait Up - all 39 episodes
 1984: Hilary - 6 episodes
 1986–1989: Ever Decreasing Circles - 14 episodes
 1987: Divided We Stand - all 6 episodes
 1988: Wife Begins at 40
 1988–1989: Brush Strokes - series 4
 1990–1995: Keeping Up Appearances - all 44 episodes
 1992: Don't Tell Father - all 6 episodes
 1994: All Night Long - all 6 episodes
 2016: Dad's Army: A Stripe For Frazer

Credits: Writing (All with Michael Knowles) 

 1974–1976: Dads Army - Radio adaptation (all 66 episodes)
 1983-1984: It Sticks Out Half a Mile - Radio spin-off of Dads Army
 1985: Walking the Plank - Pilot episode, developed into High & Dry
 1987: High & Dry - written under the pseudonym Alan Sherwood

Guest appearances 

 1987: Did You See...?
 2004–2008: Comedy Connections
 2007: The World’s Greatest Comedy Characters
 2008: The Comedy Map of Britain
 2008–2011: The Dad’s Army Podcast
 2010: The Story of ‘Are You Being Served?’
 2011: Behind the Britcoms: From Script to Screen
 2012: The Unforgettable Dick Emery 
 2014: The Many Faces of... 
 2018: Saluting Dad’s Army

Additional appearances 
Snoad has been interviewed for several television documentaries. In 1987, he appeared in Did You See...? in which he spoke about Ever Decreasing Circles. Then in 2007, he was interviewed for The World's Greatest Comedy Character and then again in 2008 for Comedy Map of Britain. Snoad appeared in four episodes of Comedy Connections in which he spoke about Dad's Army, Don't Wait Up, Ever Decreasing Circles and Keeping Up Appearances. In 2010, Snoad appeared in The Story of 'Are You Being Served. When the BBC moved from Television Centre, London, Snoad was interviewed for the documentary Tales of Television Centre. On the fiftieth anniversary of Dad's Army, Snoad appeared in four episodes of the UK TV Gold series Salting Dads Army. In 2021, it was announced that Snoad had contributed to a new upcoming book about British sitcoms in the 1970s entitled Raising Laughter: How the Sitcom Kept Britain Smiling in the '70s.

Views on studio audience
Snoad has always been a great supporter of the studio audience, saying that "when you watch comedy in a theatre or a cinema you are with other people and laughter is infectious. However, at home there could well just be a couple of you watching or you may even be alone and the genuine reaction of a studio audience (not a laughter track!) can really enhance the viewers' enjoyment."

Personal life
On 6 July 1963, Snoad married Jean Green; the couple have two children. He is a member of the Dad's Army Appreciation Society and in 2013, after the death of Bill Pertwee, he became the society's vice president, with Frank Williams as the President. Snoad frequently attends events with the society as a special guest and speaker.

Bibliography

References

External links
 

1935 births
Living people
BBC television producers
British television directors